Félix Malal Diédhiou (born 8 October 1969) is a Senegalese wrestler. He competed in the men's freestyle 68 kg at the 1996 Summer Olympics.

References

External links
 

1969 births
Living people
Senegalese male sport wrestlers
Olympic wrestlers of Senegal
Wrestlers at the 1996 Summer Olympics
Place of birth missing (living people)